Bengal Film Journalists' Association Awards commonly referred as BFJA Awards, is given by The Bengal Film Journalists' Association. The BFJA is the oldest association of film critics in India, founded in 1937 to serve the developing film journalism and film industry.

Overview
Members of the association are drawn from the film section of the entire press of West Bengal composed of dailies, periodicals and film journals in various languages published from Kolkata. Film correspondents and critics working for any newspaper or periodicals published outside Bengal having their base in Kolkata were also eligible to be members of this association.

The association was the first to institute awards in an endeavor to promote and encourage the production of better films, when in 1938, a year after its inception, the 1st Motion Picture Congress was held in Faridpur (now in Bangladesh). Representatives of the association played a vital role in its deliberations.

In 1952 when India staged the First International Film Festival, a large exhibition was held in Kolkata Maidan. It included an exhibit of antique movie cameras, projectors and other accessories, showing the growth of films and development of the Indian film industry. BFJA had its own stall where it displayed its various magazines, periodicals and journals published from Kolkata, as well as copies of old magazines and journals on films tracing the history of the growth of film journalism in the country.

Thereafter, when the I.F.F.I. became a regular event on the circuit of International Film Festivals, the BFJA tendered active assistance and co-operation whenever called upon to serve on any committee in the interest the festival’s success. For the last four years the Association has been bringing out a special bulletin to commemorate the I.F.F.I. and hosting a reception for the visiting delegates.

To the members of BFJA, cinema, apart from its basic function of providing clean entertainment, is a strong social, cultural and artistic force to help the progressive development of the nation.

Soumitra Chatterjee is the most awarded actor of all time with 9 wins, followed by Uttam Kumar (8) and Prosenjit Chatterjee (7), Rajesh Khanna (4), Sabyasachi Chakraborty (2) and Utpal Dutt (2).

Awards

Best Indian Films
Best Director 
Best Actor 	
Best Actress 	
Best Supporting Actor	
Best Supporting Actress
Best Screenplay
Best Cinematographer
Best Art Director
Best Editor
Best Music Director
Best Lyricist
Best Male Playback
Best Female Playback
Best Make Up Man
Babulal Chowkhani Memorial Trophy for Best Original Story
Most Outstanding Work of the Year (Actor and Actress) 
B.C. Agarwal Memorial Award for Best Film Critic/Journalist
Bengal Film Journalists' Association – Best Book on Cinema Award
Best Clean & Entertainment Film
Bengal Film Journalists' Association – Most Promising Director Award
Most Promising Actor
Most Promising Actress

Documentary Section
Bengal Film Journalists' Association – Best Documentary (Jointly) Award
Bengal Film Journalists' Association – Best Director Documentary (Film) Award

Special Awards
Bengal Film Journalists' Association – Hero Honda Youth Icon Awards
Bengal Film Journalists' Association – Hero Honda Voice of All Gen

Hindi Section

Bengal Film Journalists' Association – Best Film Award (Hindi)
Best Director 
Best Actor 	
Best Actress 	
Best Supporting Actor
Best Supporting Actress
Best Female Playback Singer
Best Male Playback Singer
Bengal Film Journalists' Association – Best Screenplay Award (Hindi)
Best Lyricist
Best Music Director
Bengal Film Journalists' Association – Satyajit Ray Lifetime Achievement

Foreign Film Section 
Bengal Film Journalists' Association – Best Foreign Film Award
Bengal Film Journalists' Association – Best Foreign Director Award
Bengal Film Journalists' Association – Best Foreign Actor Award
Bengal Film Journalists' Association – Best Foreign Actress Award

See also
Bengali cinema

References

External links
*
ftvdb.bfi.org.uk

 
Recurring events established in 1937
Awards established in 1938
Civil awards and decorations of West Bengal
1938 establishments in India